William Kangas is an American ice hockey coach. He has been the nominal head coach for Williams since 1989, recording more than 400 wins in that time.

Career
Kangas got his start in college hockey as a player at Vermont. After graduating with a B.A. in zoology in 1982, Kangas returned to the team as an assistant in 1984 under new head coach Mike Gilligan. Kangas helped the team improve steadily in ECAC Hockey, reaching the conference championship game in 1989. That spring, Kangas was hired to replace long-time Williams coach Bill McCormick who had helmed the team since 1954.

When Kangas took over, the Ephs hadn't had a winning season in seven years and that trend continued in his first season. In year two, however, Kangas led Williams to not only a winning mark, but their first ever postseason victory. Three years later, Williams won their first regular season title. The crown came just in time for the NESCAC, William's primary conference, to change their rules regarding national tournaments. Prior to 1994, the NESCAC did not allow member teams to participate in any national tournament. Beginning with the 1993–94 scholastic year, a NESCAC team could take part in one postseason tournament, either conference or national. With the title already in their back pocket, Williams declined to play in the ECAC East Tournament in the hopes of receiving an NCAA bid. Unfortunately, Salem State, one of the team that Williams had tied with for the regular season title, went on to win the conference tournament. Because Salem State was not under the same restrictions as Williams, they were able to accept a bid to the NCAA Tournament and Williams was left by the wayside.

A similar situation happened four years later after the Ephs finished second in their conference to three-time defending NCAA champion Middlebury. Williams had one of the best marks in the regular season at 18–5–1 but were passed over in favor of Oswego State who had a record of 16–11–2 but had won the SUNYAC regular season title and finished as the tournament runner-up.

Kangas' bad luck in this regard was rendered moot in 1999 when the NESCAC dropped the postseason restriction for its member schools, allowing them to compete on equal footing with other conferences. The same year, the NESCAC began sponsoring ice hockey as a sport and Williams joined with the 8 other active teams as a founding member of a new conference. Williams played very well in the first season, end the year as the conference Runner-Up, but the team declined afterwards. The Ephs finished with a winning record in just three of the next eight years and didn't win another postseason game until 2009. That season was a watershed for Willaims, however, and the Ephs have been one of the best teams in their conference since. In the second decade of the 21st century, Williams finished with a winning record in every season under Kangas and were conference runners-up on three separate occasions. In 2016, Williams won a regular season title for the first time in 22 years and, unlike the last time, they were able to convert it into a NCAA Tournament berth. With the drought over for the oldest Division III team, Williams wasn't satisfied with just making an appearance and won their first NCAA game, defeating Salem State 7–1.

After the following season Kangas took a year-long sabbatical, which was afforded to him since he was regarded as a regular faculty member, turning the team over to assistant Mike Monti. Kangas returned the following year and had Williams back atop the NESCAC in 2020. While the Ephs were passed over for an at-large bid that year, it wouldn't have made much difference as the COVID-19 pandemic forced the cancellation of the 2020 Tournament. Williams cancelled their 2020–21 for the same reason, but retained Kangas for their return in 2021.

College head coaching record

See also
 List of college men's ice hockey coaches with 400 wins

References

External Links

1959 births
Living people
Ice hockey people from Minnesota
People from Eveleth, Minnesota
American men's ice hockey defensemen
Vermont Catamounts men's ice hockey players
American ice hockey coaches
Williams College faculty
Williams Ephs coaches